Robert Lowell Miller Jr. (born 1950) is a senior United States district judge of the United States District Court for the Northern District of Indiana.

Education and career

Miller was born in South Bend, Indiana. He received a Bachelor of Arts degree from Northwestern University in 1972. He received a Juris Doctor from Indiana University Robert H. McKinney School of Law in 1975. He was a law clerk for the United States District Court for the Northern District of Indiana in 1975. He was a judge of the St. Joseph County Superior Court in South Bend from 1975 to 1985.

Federal judicial service

Miller was nominated by President Ronald Reagan on October 23, 1985, to the United States District Court for the Northern District of Indiana, to a new seat created by 98 Stat. 333. He was confirmed by the United States Senate on December 16, 1985, and received his commission on December 17, 1985. He served as Chief Judge from 2003 to 2010. He assumed senior status on January 11, 2016.

On July 8, 2020, Miller was appointed to the United States Foreign Intelligence Surveillance Court of Review by Chief Justice John Roberts.

References

Sources
 

1950 births
Living people
Indiana state court judges
Judges of the United States District Court for the Northern District of Indiana
Judges of the United States Foreign Intelligence Surveillance Court of Review
Northwestern University alumni
People from South Bend, Indiana
United States district court judges appointed by Ronald Reagan
20th-century American judges
21st-century American judges